San Giuliano di Puglia is a small town and comune in the province of Campobasso, in the region of Molise, in Italy.

Even though it is now part of Molise, its name still recalls its former administrative and cultural association with the region of Apulia (Puglia).

It is mainly an agricultural centre.

2002 earthquake 

On October 31, 2002, the town was severely damaged by an earthquake.

The event provoked the collapse of the local school, in which 26 of the 51 pupils lost their lives, together with one of their teachers.
None of the 9 boys of the 4th class (born in 1996) survived.

The quake was the first seismic event on this site, and the town was not included in any seismic map for preventive protection purposes.

References

Cities and towns in Molise